Alexandra is a former Victorian Railways station located in the town of Alexandra, on the Alexandra railway line in Victoria, Australia. The station was the terminus of the branch line from Cathkin to Alexandra along the Tallarook to Mansfield line. It was closed in November 1978.

The main weatherboard station building still remains at Alexandra Station, along with many other local railway and timber logging related buildings. The site is now the headquarters of the Alexandra Timber Tramway and Museum Inc. which maintains a short narrow gauge railway within the grounds of the station precinct. The Goulburn River High Country Rail Trail now ends at the Alexandra Timber Tramway.

References

Railway stations in Australia opened in 1909
Railway stations closed in 1978
Disused railway stations in Victoria (Australia)
1978 disestablishments in Australia